Friedrich Eduard König (November 15, 1846 – February 10, 1936, Bonn) was a German Lutheran divine and  Semitic scholar.

Biography 
He was born at Reichenbach im Vogtland and was educated at the University of Leipzig (1867–71). Afterwards, he worked as a religious instructor at the Royal Realgymnasium in Döbeln (1871–76) and at the Thomasschule zu Leipzig (1876–79). He then became a lecturer (1879) and an associate professor of theology (1885) at the University of Leipzig. In 1888 he became a full professor at Rostock and in 1900 at the University of Bonn, where, as a theologian attacking  Panbabylonism,  he became involved in the so-called "Babel-Bible Dispute".

Published works 
As a linguist  he attempted to apply the phonetic and physiological methods of modern philology to Hebrew and Ethiopic in such works as 
 Gedanke, Laut und Accent als die drei Factoren der Sprachbildung (1874) – Thought, sound, and accent: as the three factors of language formation comparatively and physiologically represented in Hebrew.
 Neue Studien über Schrift: Aussprache und allgemeine Formenlehre des Aethiopischen (1877) – New studies on Scripture: pronunciation and general morphology of Ethiopian.
 Historisch-kritisches Lehrgebäude der Hebräischen Sprache, 3 books, (1881–97) – Historical-critical teaching of the Hebrew language.

Among his innumerable publications are also: 
 Religious History of Israel (1885); translation of Die Hauptprobleme der Altisraelitischen Religionsgeschichte (1884).
 Einleitung in das Alte Testament (1893).
 The exiles' book of consolation contained in Isaiah XL-LXVI : a critical and exegetical study; translated from the German by J.A. Selbie (1899).
 The Emphatic State in Aramaic (1901)  In: The American Journal of Semitic Language  Vol. 17, No. 4, Jul., 1901.
 Neueste Prinzipien der alttestamentlichen Kritik (1902).
 Bible and Babylon : Their Relationship in the History of Culture, translated by William Turnbull (1903).  Pilter Kessinger Publishing Company 2006, ; translation of Bibel und Babel : eine kulturgeschichtliche Skizze (1902).
 Die Gottesfrage und der Ursprung des Alten Testaments (1903).
 Ahasver der ewige Jude nach seiner ursprünglichen Idee und seiner literarischen Verwertung betrachtet (1907).
 Geschichte des Reiches Gottes bis auf Jesus Christus (1908).
Hebräisches und aramäisches Wörterbuch zum Alten Testament (1910) 
 Geschichte der alttestamentlichen Religion, kritisch dargestellt (1912).

References

External links
  Jewish Encyclopedia

1846 births
1936 deaths
German biblical scholars
People from the Kingdom of Saxony
Leipzig University alumni
Academic staff of Leipzig University
Academic staff of the University of Bonn
Academic staff of the University of Rostock